Crematogaster consternens is a species of ant of the subfamily Myrmicinae, which can be found from Sri Lanka.

References

External links

 at antwiki.org
Animaldiversity.org

consternens
Hymenoptera of Asia